The Singles is Feeder's second UK compilation album, following the limited release b-sides album Picture of Perfect Youth.

The album has 18 of their UK top 40 hit single tracks (if "Shatter" and "Tender" are separately counted), with the exception of "Day In Day Out" and "Find The Colour", and includes the limited edition Arena Tour single "Comfort In Sound" and three new tracks, "Lost And Found", "Burn The Bridges" and "Save Us". "Lost and Found" and "Save Us" were released as singles to promote the compilation shortly before and after its release, charting at #12 and #34 in the UK respectively, while "Shatter" was released to promote the compilation, shortly after the band announced its release plans in October 2005. "Burn The Bridges" is the only song on the compilation which was not released as a single.

It was the first time the singles "Suffocate" (a re-recorded version) and "Shatter" had a parent album connected to them while "Just a Day" (the edited version) had its first commercial album appearance (its unedited version also appears on Picture of Perfect Youth).

Limited Edition copies of the album are packaged with a DVD containing all of their promotional videos filmed to that point, bar an alternate "Piece By Piece" film used to promote the song's release as a single in mainland Europe. It is essentially an edit of the video for previous single "Suffocate". The DVD version of the album was actually for three weeks the UK's best-selling music DVD, but the DVD charts do not account for such releases and only DVDs that are packaged with no audio discs. This in turn made it album chart eligible instead. Later on in the year U2 did a similar theme with their U218 Singles package, but sold the DVD separately so both releases appeared in their own respective charts.

Feeder's singles compilation made #2 in the UK charts after entering at #3 the week before. It went Platinum in August shipping over 300,000 copies. The album also seen an increase in publicity for the band, with a commercial on terrestrial TV which promoted the release.

At the end of 2006, the album's UK shipment increased to 500,000, and went Gold in the Republic of Ireland with sales over 7,500. Combined paid for sales and streaming sales equivalent units for the album, currently stand at 528,299 as of August 2019, making it one of the most popular artist compilation albums of all-time, in terms of sales within the United Kingdom. It is also Feeder's first and currently only album to gain a certification internationally.

Reception

The album is currently Feeder's longest-running release on the album top 5, top 10, top 20, top 30, and top 40 respectively. It has to date spent 30 weeks on the top 75, six behind Comfort in Sound, but charted on the 2006 year-end chart at #48, beating the #66 of the latter in 2003. It is also Feeder's first release to date to climb up the charts on its second week, in which it moved from #3 to #2 behind the Red Hot Chili Peppers's Stadium Arcadium; the following week it then dropped back down to its starting position of #3 when Orson's Bright Idea entered at the top. The album then dropped to #8 the week after, giving them their first album to spend more than a week in the top 10. It also spent the same number of weeks in those positions as all their four previous studio albums combined.

It was the UK's best-selling album by a British artist for its first three weeks, outselling the year's eventual biggest-seller, Eyes Open by Snow Patrol, for each of those weeks during that time. The album gained a UK platinum certification and was eventually more successful than Orson's Bright Idea.

The album also became the first ever Feeder release to gain a non-UK sales certification, with 7,500 copies qualifying it for gold status in Ireland, despite never charting a top 20 single there. Although the album was not as well received in the mainland of Europe as Pushing the Senses, it became Feeder's first ever top 10 breakthrough on the European Top 100 Albums, with a 16-week stay on the top 100, mainly due to its UK chart peak, making the top 20 in Ireland, and top 100 in Flanders. In Japan, the album became Feeder's first top 40 album chart entry anywhere outside of the UK and Ireland, by charting at #37 ("Feeling a Moment" made the top 40 singles chart in Australia).

The album also holds the domestic record as the fastest-selling release on the Echo Label, in terms of time taken to go platinum. The compilation shipped its 300,000th copy just under three months after its release date, beating the previous record held by the Moloko studio album Things to Make and Do, which had taken six months. The album is seen by many corners of the British music press as a large commercial success.

Track listing
CD
"Come Back Around" – 3:12 - from Comfort in Sound
"Buck Rogers" – 3:12 - from Echo Park
"Shatter" (single mix) – 2:57 - originally a B-side of 'Tumble and Fall', and from the Japanese Pushing the Senses.
"Just the Way I'm Feeling" – 4:18 - from Comfort in Sound
"Lost & Found" – 2:56 - new song
"Just a Day" (single edit) – 3:45 - original version appears on Picture of Perfect Youth
"High" – 4:33 - from the Polythene reissue
"Comfort in Sound" (Spike mix) – 3:37 - original version on Comfort in Sound
"Feeling a Moment" – 4:09 - from Pushing The Senses
"Burn the Bridges" – 3:37 - new song
"Tumble and Fall" – 4:20 - from Pushing the Senses
"Forget About Tomorrow" – 3:51 - from Comfort in Sound
"Tender" – 4:16 - from Pushing the Senses
"Pushing the Senses" (single mix) – 3:27 - original version on Pushing the Senses
"Save Us" – 3:50 - new song
"Seven Days in the Sun" – 3:39 - from Echo Park
"Insomnia" – 2:52 - from Yesterday Went Too Soon
"Turn" – 4:30 - from Echo Park
"Yesterday Went Too Soon" – 4:17 - from Yesterday Went Too Soon
"Suffocate" (single version) – 4:43 - original version on Polythene

DVD
 "Lost and Found" – 2:58
 "Shatter" – 3:00
 "Tender" – 4:21
 "Pushing the Senses" – 3:26
 "Feeling a Moment" – 4:13
 "Tumble and Fall" – 4:21
 "Comfort in Sound" – 3:40
 "Find the Colour" – 3:43
 "Forget About Tomorrow" – 3:52
 "Just the Way I'm Feeling" – 4:04
 "Come Back Around" – 3:15
 "Piece By Piece" (Animated Version) – 4:20
 "Just A Day" – 4:09
 "Turn" – 4:07
 "Seven Days in the Sun" – 3:41
 "Buck Rogers" – 3:12
 "Paperfaces" – 4:03
 "Yesterday Went Too Soon" – 4:20
 "Insomnia" – 3:00
 "Day In Day Out" – 3:29
 "Suffocate" – 4:03
 "High" – 4:28
 "Crash" – 3:49
 "Cement" – 3:18
 "Tangerine" – 3:55
 "Stereo World" – 3:30

Charts

Weekly charts

Year-end charts

References

2006 greatest hits albums
Feeder albums
2006 video albums
Music video compilation albums